Minnesota State Highway 47 (MN 47) is a   highway in east–central Minnesota, which runs from its intersection with Central Avenue (State Highway 65) in Minneapolis and continues north to its northern terminus at its intersection with U.S. Highway 169 in Aitkin.

For part of its route (8 miles), it runs together with U.S. Highway 10 in Coon Rapids and Anoka.  The two routes are concurrent from Foley Boulevard in Coon Rapids to Ferry Street (US 169) in Anoka.

Highway 47 also runs together with State Highway 18 for 9 miles in Mille Lacs and Aitkin counties around the northeast side of Mille Lacs Lake.

Route description
State Highway 47 serves as a north–south route between Minneapolis, Fridley, Coon Rapids, Anoka, Ramsey, St. Francis, Ogilvie, Isle, and Aitkin in east–central Minnesota.

State Highway 47 begins at the intersection of Central Avenue (State Highway 65) and University Avenue in northeast Minneapolis.  Highway 47 is signed locally as University Avenue in northeast Minneapolis. The route remains University Avenue NE through Columbia Heights and Fridley to its junction with Highways 10 and 610 at the Coon Rapids / Blaine boundary line.

The route is built as a divided highway north of its junction with 32nd Avenue NE / St. Anthony Parkway in Minneapolis.  Highway 47 continues as a divided highway on its independent segment through Columbia Heights and Fridley.  The route has an interchange with Interstate 694 in Fridley and another interchange with Highways 10 and 610 at the Coon Rapids / Blaine boundary line.  Highway 47 joins the Highway 10 freeway at this point.  Highways 10 and 47 run concurrent for 8 miles through Coon Rapids and Anoka.

Highway 47 leaves Highway 10 at its junction with Ferry Street in the city of Anoka.  Highway 47 continues independently again northbound through the cities of Anoka and Ramsey as St. Francis Boulevard.  The route continues north through the Anoka County communities of Nowthen and St. Francis.

The route enters Isanti County and passes through Bradford, Pine Brook, and Dalbo.  Highway 47 has a junction with State Highway 95 at Pine Brook.  Highway 47 enters Kanabec County and continues north to Ogilvie, where it has a junction with State Highway 23.

Highway 47 enters Mille Lacs County and joins State Highway 27 briefly to Isle at the southeast corner of Mille Lacs Lake.  Father Hennepin State Park is located one mile west of the junction of Highway 47 and Highway 27 at Isle. The park entrance is located on Highway 27.

The route continues northbound around the east side of Mille Lacs Lake.  Highway 47 has a junction with State Highway 18 in northeast Mille Lacs County.  The route runs together with Highway 18 for 9 miles around the northeast side of the lake; continuing north to Malmo at the northeast corner of the lake.

Highway 47 continues independently for 21 miles between Malmo and the city of Aitkin.  The route is also known as 4th Street SE in Aitkin.  The northern terminus of Highway 47 is at its intersection with U.S. Highway 169 (Minnesota Avenue) in the city of Aitkin.
  
At the southern terminus of Highway 47 in northeast Minneapolis, "University Avenue" further extends itself into Saint Paul (as Ramsey County Road 34), ending at Lafayette Road.  This section of "University Avenue" passes by landmarks such as the University of Minnesota and the Minnesota State Capitol.

History
State Highway 47 was established in 1963.

Highway 47 was originally an extension of State Highway 56; which ran from southern Minnesota to Hampton; and then was concurrent with U.S. Highway 52 into downtown Saint Paul; then along University Avenue in both Saint Paul and Minneapolis.  In 1963, State Highway 56 was terminated in downtown St. Paul and the section from Minneapolis north to Aitkin was renumbered State Highway 47.

Highway 47 was paved at the time it was created. Its predecessor was unpaved north of Anoka in 1940. By 1953, only the northerly section near Aitkin was still unpaved. It was completely paved by 1960.

The section of Highway 47 in Columbia Heights and Fridley was built as a divided highway by 1970.

Major intersections

References

047
Transportation in Hennepin County, Minnesota
Transportation in Anoka County, Minnesota
Transportation in Isanti County, Minnesota
Transportation in Kanabec County, Minnesota
Transportation in Mille Lacs County, Minnesota
Transportation in Aitkin County, Minnesota